Nasir al-Din Mahmud I was the sultan of the Seljuk Empire from 1092 to 1094. He succeeded Malik Shah I as Sultan, but he did not gain control of the empire built by Malik Shah and Alp Arslan.

Terken Khatun, the wife of Malik Shah, tried to win the throne for her 4 year old son Mahmud, who was proclaimed sultan in Baghdad.

The older son of Malik Shah, Barkiyaruq, was proclaimed too, and the armies of the two pretenders met in Borujerd, near Hamadan. The forces of Barkiyaruq won and took the capital Isfahan. After this, Mahmud and his mother were assassinated by the family of the vizir Nizam al-Mulk.

Following Malik Shah I's death, successor states split from the Great Seljuk. In Anatolia, Malik Shah I was succeeded by Kilij Arslan I, who escaped from Isfahan; and in Syria by Mahmud's uncle Tutush I. Other governors in Aleppo and Amid declared independence too. The disunity within the Seljuk realms allowed for the unexpected success of the First Crusade shortly afterwards, beginning in 1096.

References

Sources 
 
 

11th-century births
Seljuk rulers
11th-century monarchs in the Middle East
1087 births
1094 deaths
11th-century Turkic people